Journey of Bhangover is an Indian Hindi-language comedy thriller film, directed by Mahinder Singh Saniwal. It stars Prerika Arora, Aradhya Taing, Jimmy Sharma, Yashpal Sharma,  Anmol Khatri, Palash Soni and Hemant Pandey.

The film is set to release on 15 December 2017.

Cast
 Prerika Arora  
 Aradhya Taing  
 Jimmy Sharma 
 Hemant Pandey   
 Anmol Khatri  
 Palash Soni  
 Yashpal Sharma  
 Jaideep Ahlwat  
 Rohit Thakur
 Soniya Sharma  
 The Begraj  
 Rajoo Maan
 Sapna Chowdhary as item number "Love Bite"

Soundtrack
The Music Was Composed By Siddhant Madhav and Released by T-Series.All Lyrics were written by Azeem Shirazi.

See also

List of Hindi comedy films
 List of Bollywood thriller films

References

Further reading

External links 
 
 
 

Hindi-language comedy films
2010s buddy comedy films
2010s Hindi-language films
Indian buddy comedy films